Coronado is a coastal city and resort located about 87km (54 miles) southwest of Panama City. Coronado was the first resort development in Panama and is a popular destination for tourism.

History
Coronado is part of the first structured agrarian culture that began to take form within Panama in the 18th century. The first colonial estates were established in Anton and in the Region of Llanos del Chirú (modern Coronado), with an economic system that included the use of slavery. The region included large prairies bordering the Pacific Ocean and became the site of the first legal possession of land in Panama . Between 1691 and 1693, three large estates were created to shape the structure of the real estate register.

This route was used by pirates, smugglers, fugitives, and road thieves among others that pillaged towns, set up ambushes, and favored the opening of the closed Hispanic trade route on the Coasts of the South Pacific, where Coronado had a singular position during colonial times.

The modern city was founded in 1941 by Robert Eisenmann and has continued to grow since.

References

External links
 http://playacommunity.com/  Online Coronado Community Newspaper
 http://www.coronadoesvida.com  Official website of Coronado.

Seaside resorts
Resorts in Panama
Panamá Oeste Province